Andrei Chistyakov may refer to:

 Andrei Chistyakov (ice hockey) (born 1962), retired ice hockey player
 Andrei Chistyakov (conductor) (1949–2000), Russian conductor